Rüdiger Heinze (born December 14, 1971, in Riesa, East Germany) is a film producer and screenwriter.

Life and work
In 1997 he went to Ludwigsburg to study film direction and later film production at the Film Academy Baden-Württemberg. In 2003 Rüdiger Heinze earned his university degree. He has worked several times as a film director. In 2008 he co-founded the production company Zum Goldenen Lamm. 

Rüdiger Heinze produced the film The Two Lives of Daniel Shore, which was written and directed by Michael Dreher and was released in 2009.

Filmography (selection)
2003: The Troublemaker (Der Ärgermacher) (television producer)
2004: Don't Look for Me (Such mich nicht) (film producer)
2005: Rabenkinder (TV movie) (film producer)
2006: Der Generalmanager oder How to sell a Tit Wonder (co-director)
2007: Blind Flight (Blindflug) (co-producer)
2009: Parkour (screenwriter, film producer)
2009: Die zwei Leben des Daniel Shore (film producer)

Awards and nominations
Winner of the Sat.1 Talent Award for a comedy concept

References

External links
 

1971 births
Living people
German film producers
People from Riesa
Mass media people from Saxony